Redslob is a surname of:

 Robert Redslob (1882–1962), German-French constitutional and public international law-scientist 
 Edwin Redslob (1884–1973), German art historian, publisher and university scholar